Steenkool Airport (also known as Bintuni Airport) is an airport located in West Bintuni, Bintuni, West Papua, Indonesia.

Airlines and destinations

References 
 Bintuni - Direktorat Jendral Perhubungan Udara

Airports in West Papua (province)